Salih Korkmaz (born 1 January 1997) is a Turkish racewalking athlete.

In 2017, he finished in 4th place in the men's 20 kilometres walk at the 2017 European Athletics U23 Championships held in Bydgoszcz, Poland.

Representing Turkey at the 2019 World Athletics Championships, he placed fifth in 20 kilometres walk. He won the silver medal at the 2019 European Athletics U23 Championships held in Gävle, Sweden.

References

External links

Turkish male racewalkers
1997 births
Living people
World Athletics Championships athletes for Turkey
People from Malatya Province
Athletes (track and field) at the 2020 Summer Olympics
Olympic athletes of Turkey
Olympic male racewalkers
21st-century Turkish people